In probability theory and statistics, two real-valued random variables, are said to be uncorrelated if their covariance, is zero. If two variables are uncorrelated, there is no linear relationship between them.

Uncorrelated random variables have a Pearson correlation coefficient, when it exists, of zero, except in the trivial case when either variable has zero variance (is a constant).  In this case the correlation is undefined.

In general, uncorrelatedness is not the same as orthogonality, except in the special case where at least one of  the two random variables has an expected value of 0.

However, not all uncorrelated variables are independent.

Definition

Definition for two real random variables
Two random variables  are called uncorrelated if their covariance  is zero. Formally:

Definition for two complex random variables
Two complex random variables  are called uncorrelated if their covariance  and their pseudo-covariance  is zero, i.e.

Definition for more than two random variables
A set of two or more random variables  is called uncorrelated if each pair of them is uncorrelated. This is equivalent to the requirement that the non-diagonal elements of the autocovariance matrix  of the random vector  are all zero. The autocovariance matrix is defined as:

Examples of dependence without correlation

Example 1
 Let  be a random variable that takes the value 0 with probability 1/2, and takes the value 1 with probability 1/2.
The claim is that  and  have zero covariance (and thus are uncorrelated), but are not independent.

Proof:

Taking into account that

 
 

Q.E.D.

Example 2

on the other hand,  is 0 on the triangle defined by  although  is not null on this domain. 
Therefore  and the variables are not independent.

Therefore the variables are uncorrelated.

When uncorrelatedness implies independence
There are cases in which uncorrelatedness does imply independence. One of these cases is the one in which both random variables are two-valued (so each can be linearly transformed to have a Bernoulli distribution).  Further, two jointly normally distributed random variables are independent if they are uncorrelated, although this does not hold for variables whose marginal distributions are normal and uncorrelated but whose joint distribution is not joint normal (see Normally distributed and uncorrelated does not imply independent).

Generalizations

Uncorrelated random vectors
.

They are uncorrelated if and only if their cross-covariance matrix  is zero.

where

and
.

Uncorrelated stochastic processes
Formally:

.

See also
Correlation and dependence
Binomial distribution: Covariance between two binomials
Uncorrelated Volume Element

References

Further reading
Probability for Statisticians, Galen R. Shorack, Springer (c2000) 

Covariance and correlation

de:Korrelation